The Great Parks Bicycle Route is a two-part bicycle touring route developed and mapped by Adventure Cycling Association. Great Parks North runs 751.5 miles (1209.4 km) from Jasper, Alberta, Canada, to Missoula, Montana, U.S. Great Parks South extends 694.5 miles from Steamboat Springs, Colorado, to Durango, Colorado. When combined with a portion of the TransAmerica Bicycle Trail, the Great Parks Route can be ridden continuously from Jasper to Durango for a total mileage of 2512 miles (4042.6 km). The route passes through Jasper National Park, Banff National Park, Kootenay National Park, and Waterton Lakes National Park in Canada. Crossing into the United States, the route passes through Glacier National Park, Yellowstone National Park, Grand Teton National Park, Rocky Mountain National Park, Black Canyon of the Gunnison National Park, and Mesa Verde National Park before arriving in Durango.

Provinces and States on the Great Parks Bicycle Route
Alberta
British Columbia
Montana
Wyoming
Colorado

See also
Bicycle touring
Adventure Cycling Route Network

References

External links 
Great Parks Bicycle Route
Adventure Cycling Association
Bicycle Colorado
Colorado Bicycle Program
Colorado Bicycle Trails
League of American Bicyclist

Bike paths in Alberta 
Bike paths in British Columbia 
Bike paths in Colorado 
Bike paths in Montana 
Bike paths in Wyoming